Lake Hopkins is a salt lake in the east of Western Australia very close to the Northern Territory border. This drainage basin is known as the Amadeus Basin. The lake is usually a dry salt pan, and only holds water for short periods after heavy rainfall. Lake Hopkins has an elevation of 441 metres (1447 feet) above mean sea level.
The lake proved to be quite an obstacle to progress for Len Beadell during construction of the Sandy Blight Junction Road in 1960.

See also
 Lake Amadeus
 Lake Neale
 Sandy Blight Junction Road

References

External links
 Central Australian groundwater discharge zone

Saline lakes of Western Australia